We'll Carry The Star Spangled Banner Thru The Trenches is a World War I song written by Daisy May Pratt Erd. The song was first published in 1917 by Lang & Mendelsohn in Boston MA. The sheet music cover depicts soldiers advancing over barbed wire with a flag waving.

The sheet music can be found at the Pritzker Military Museum & Library.

References 

Bibliography
Parker, Bernard S. World War I Sheet Music 1. Jefferson: McFarland & Company, Inc., 2007. . 
Paas, John Roger. 2014. America sings of war: American sheet music from World War I. . 
Vogel, Frederick G. World War I Songs: A History and Dictionary of Popular American Patriotic Tunes, with Over 300 Complete Lyrics. Jefferson: McFarland & Company, Inc., 1995. . 

1917 songs
Songs of World War I